Chirkin is a Russian masculine surname, its feminine counterpart is Chirkina. It may refer to
Grigori Chirkin  (born 1986), Russian football player
Vladimir Chirkin (born 1955), Russian military officer

See also
Gyuzeychirkin

Russian-language surnames